Irma Lozano Gallo (born 9 March 1933) is a Mexican diver. She competed in the women's 10 metre platform event at the 1952 Summer Olympics.

Notes

References

External links
 

1933 births
Living people
Mexican female divers
Olympic divers of Mexico
Divers at the 1952 Summer Olympics
Place of birth missing (living people)